Conjux is a commune in the Savoie department in the Auvergne-Rhône-Alpes region in southeastern France. Since January 2017, the commune has formed part of the conurbation of Grand Lac, following the fusion of the former Communauté de communes de Chautagne into this larger agglomeration.

At 175 ha, the smallest commune in the region of Chautagne, Conjux extends for 5 km along the northwestern coastline of Lac du Bourget; it is bounded to the north by the Canal de Savières and backed by Mount Landard to the west. The commune of Conjux includes the hamlets of La Chatière, Portout and Semelas. Reflecting its mixed role as a residential and recreational location, 42% of its residential buildings are counted as secondary residences.

Toponym 

The name of the commune is believed to be derived, via the forms 'Conziacum' (early 12th Century), 'Conjiacum' (1481) and 'Conjeux' (1780),  from late Latin 'Congiacum', meaning the 'domain of Congius.' Its derivation is not related to the Latin homonym, 'conjux' (spouse).

Economic activity 

Fishing was traditionally the mainstay of the village, but today only two professional fishermen are based in the commune. The recently expanded Port of Conjux is now largely used for recreational boating and amateur fishing.  Economic activity is largely confined to small businesses, including a burgeoning supply of holiday accommodation and a restaurant, and salaried work in nearby cities such as Aix-les-Bains and Chambéry.  The commune maintains a municipal camping ground, Les Babelles, and a bathing beach, as well as managing the boating harbour.  The commune recently also undertook a major plan to redevelop the port and beach area, the 'Port-Plage' project, entailing enlargement of the port, opening up of the Biez rivulet (previously partially piped underground to the lake) to restore the natural waterway, and improvements to tourist and fishing facilities.

Chapel 

The chapel of Saints-Crépin-et-Crépinien at Conjux dates in part from the 15th century.  Formerly a parish church, it was not restored to that status following the reestablishment of worship after the Concordat of 1801. It was established as a vicarial chapel in 1883.  The building was badly damaged in an earthquake in 1826, fell in ruins in 1886, and was restored in several stages (1890, 1938 and 1978).  The rebuilt neoGothic nave has a ribbed vault, linked to a side chapel comprising remains of the 15th Century building.  The interior includes a polished wood statue of the Madonna and Child from the 14th Century, Gallo-Roman remains including an inscribed funerary stone, and an altar of Cybele.

Archeology 

An underwater archaeological site, Conjux-le-Port-3, includes visible remains from prehistoric pile dwellings around the Alps, with evidence of occupation from Neolithic to late Bronze Age times and the discernable outline of the now submerged village. Dendrochronological evidence dates the Conjux-Port 1 site from between 832 and 813 BC. The site was classified as an historical monument in 2011.

Portout was the site of a Gallo-Roman pottery, active in the third century CE. The site was excavated between 1976 and 1983: the objects discovered now form the bulk of the collection on display at the Musée Gallo-Romain in neighbouring Chanaz.

World War Two 

Under German occupation during the Second World War, Conjux is remembered for two contrasting humanitarian acts.  In March 1943, a German military plane crashed in Lac du Bourget while on a training flight. Fishermen from Conjux rescued the two surviving crew who were then sheltered by local families despite misgivings about giving aid to the occupying military; offers of financial rewards were refused, and four prisoners of war were later released as a reciprocal gesture. The incident is portrayed in the 2013 film of France-based German film maker Anja Unger, L'Avion du Lac. During the Nazi occupation, Conjuxiens Félix and Marie Maurier sheltered a young Jewish girl, Liliane Kuhn, presenting her as their grandchild. She survived the holocaust, and her protectors were subsequently recognised as Righteous Among the Nations.

Images

See also
Communes of the Savoie department

References

Communes of Savoie